Milan Kristić was the a Yugoslav football coach who managed the Tunisia national team from 1960 to 1961. He led the Tunisian side which competed in the 1960 Summer Olympics, where they suffered three defeats to Poland, Argentina and Denmark and exited the tournament in the group stage.

Kristić was Tunisia's first ever foreign manager and was succeeded in that post by his compatriot Frane Matošić.

References

External links
 

Year of birth missing
Possibly living people
Yugoslav football managers
CS Sfaxien managers
Tunisia national football team managers
Yugoslav expatriate football managers
Expatriate football managers in Tunisia
Yugoslav expatriate sportspeople in Tunisia